Fuxing Islet (Fuhsing Islet,  Hou-chai Hsü) is an islet located south of Lesser Kinmen (Lieyu) in Lieyu Township, Kinmen County (Quemoy), Fujian Province, Republic of China (Taiwan). The name of the islet was originally Phaktia.

History
On August 31, 1975, then-Premier Chiang Ching-kuo visited the islet and met with the soldiers stationed there.

On the night of October 19, 2016, the Coast Guard seized a fishing boat with a four man crew captained by a native of Fujian, PRC that was found operating 0.2 nautical miles from Fuhsing Islet (Fuxing Islet). In October 2016, the Coast Guard had arrested thirty-four crewman from ten Chinese boats in the Kinmen County area.

Gallery

See also
 List of islands of Taiwan

References

External links
 知海-空拍系列-烈嶼 復興嶼 ('Knowing the Ocean- Aerial Photography Series- Lieyu Fuxing Islet') via Resource Center of Marine Education, Kinmen County

Islands of Fujian, Republic of China
Landforms of Kinmen County
Lieyu Township